Larkana is a city located in the Sind province of Pakistan. It is the 15th largest city of Pakistan by population. It is home to the Indus Valley civilization site Mohenjo-daro. The historic Indus River flows in east and south of the city.

The city is located within Larkana District. According to the 2017 Census of Pakistan, its population is 490,508. Therefore, it is the fourth most populated city of Sindh province after Karachi, Hyderabad, and Sukkur. Moreover, Larkana city has been placed as fifteenth largest of Pakistan during Census 2017.

Geography 
Larkana is situated at Latitude 24 56' 00' and Longitude 67 11' 00'. It is situated in northwest part of Sindh and it has own division. It is also included in Upper Sindh.

Climate 
Larkana has a hot desert climate (Köppen climate classification BWh) with sweltering summers and mild winters.

Administration

The deputy commissioner is the head of the District Administrative system. Nouman Sadique Latki is the deputy commissioner of Larkana.

The district of Larkana is administratively subdivided into the following talukas:
 Dokri
 Bakrani
 Larkana
 Ratodero

Education 
Several old and new schools, colleges, as well as university are functioning in the city for both boys and girls. Many are private and public institutions. IBA has takeover Public School and from 2018, Agha Khan University Education Board will takeover Sindh Board

Schools, colleges and training institutes 
Local schools include Government Pilot School, Larkana (founded in 1926 by the British colonists), Girls High School, Public School Larkana, Deeni Madersa High School, and Government Degree College. Technical institutes include Polytechnic Institute and Teachers' Training College.

(UN ECOSOC accredited organization) has established STEVTA registered technical and vocational training institute for girls in 2017. DESSI International imparts free trainings along with giving monthly stipends through NAVTTC and BBSHRRDB/BBSYDP projects in Larkana since 2017. DESSI International also provides training programs of Beautician, Diploma in IT, Computers, Dress Making, Rilli Applique, Spoken and Business English, Chinese language and other different short and professional courses in Larkana.

University and campuses 
SZABIST opened its first campus in Larkana in 2004. It offers degrees in BBA (day), BA (day), MBA (evening), EMBA. A few years later the SZABIST Trust established two school and college in the city: Montessori to Class VII (Junior School) and Class VIII to XII (School and College).

Chandka Medical College (CMC) was established and inaugurated by the former prime minister of Pakistan Zulfiqar Ali Bhutto on 20 April 1973. It was the fourth public medical college to be established in the province of Sindh. Chandka Medical College is recognised by Pakistan Medical & Dental Council (PMDC). The College of Physicians & Surgeons Pakistan (CPSP) has also established its regional center at the campus of CMC Larkana. CMC is recently upgraded to Shaheed Mohtarma Benazir Bhutto Medical University.

In 2009, Quaid-e-Awam University College of Engineering Science & Technology (QUCEST), Larkano, was established in the outskirt of Larkana, under the directives of Government of Sindh in collaboration with Quaid-e-Awam University of Engineering Science & Technology (QUEST), Nawabshah, Sindh. The campus offers bachelor of engineering degrees in the technologies of civil engineering, mechanical engineering, electronic engineering and electrical engineering.

Transport 
Larkana Railway Station is located in the center of the city. It connects Larkana to the rest of Sindh and Pakistan. Pakistan Railway also assists in the transportation of agricultural products to provincial capital Karachi from Larkana.  Moenjodaro Airport is located near Mohen-jo-daro, 28 km away to the south of the city of Larkana, about 5 kilometres away from Dokri.

Larkana is connected via land buses to most major cities in the country, including Karachi, Islamabad, and Quetta.

Sport 
Larkana was the birthplace of the Sindh Games. It also hosted the 12th Sindh Games in 2009 which included sports such as football, gymnastics, hockey, judo, karate, squash, table tennis, tennis, volleyball, weightlifting, and wushu. It also included traditional games such as kodi kodi, malakhara, shooting and wanjhwatti. Larkana was also home to cricket team Larkana Bulls.

The Larkana Tennis Association provides the only tennis court in Larkana, and coaches boys coming from various other cities.

Notable people 
 Muhammad Tahir - Founder of Jamaat Islah ul Muslimeen Pakistan, Roohani Talaba Jamaat Pakistan & Sajjada Nasheen Dargah Allah Abad Shareef Kandiaro,Sindh
 Jan Mohammad Abbasi – Vice President of Jamaat-e-Islami Pakistan
 Abdul Ghafoor Bhurgri – lawyer, politician, writer
 Abdul-Majid Bhurgri – developer of computing in the Sindhi
 Benazir Bhutto – former prime minister of Pakistan
 Fatima Bhutto – novelist, journalist
 Mumtaz Ali Bhutto – former governor, Chief Minister of Sindh and federal minister 
 Murtaza Bhutto – founder of the PPP Shaheed Bhutto; son of Z. A Bhutto
 Shah Nawaz Bhutto – prime minister of State of Jhunagarah, prominent landowner, politician, initiator and mover of Sukkur Barrage; father of Z. A Bhutto
 Zulfikar Ali Bhutto – former president and prime minister of Pakistan
 Sobho Gianchandani – lawyer and scholar
 Muhammad Ayub Khuhro – former chief minister of Sindh, former defense minister of Pakistan 
 Rauf Lala – comedian
 Abida Parveen – Sufi singer
 Bashir Ahmed Qureshi – chairman of the Jeay Sindh Qaumi Mahaz (JSQM)
 Muhammad Sharif – ex-Federal Secretary and Home Minister Sindh
 Qazi Fazlullah Ubaidullah – former chief minister of Sindh and Federal Minister
 Khalid Mehmood Soomro former senator of (JUI)
 Shahnawaz Dahani – Cricketer

See also 
 Larkana District
 History of Larkana
 2014 Larkana temple attack
 Mohen-jo-daro
 Larkana Bulls
 Abida Parveen
 Sohai Ali Abro
 Indus Valley civilization
 List of Indus Valley Civilization sites
 List of inventions and discoveries of the Indus Valley Civilization
 Hydraulic engineering of the Indus Valley Civilization

References

Bibliography

External links 

Populated places in Larkana District
Metropolitan areas of Pakistan